Agra (Urdu,) is a village of Sahiwal District in the Punjab province of Pakistan.

References

Populated places in Sahiwal District
Towns in Punjab (Pakistan)